New York State Forests are administered by the Division of Lands and Forests of the New York State Department of Environmental Conservation (NYSDEC). New York State Forests include reforestation, multiple use, and unique areas; and state nature and historic preserves, with approximately  classified as reforestation areas and approximately  classified as multiple use lands. Land within the Adirondack Park or the Catskill Park is not included as part of the State Forest system.

State Forest management  
The purpose of state forest management in New York is to promote forest conservation, improve ecosystem health and biodiversity, provide recreational opportunities, and derive economic benefits from forests by employing sustainable management practices.

Permissible activities on New York state forest lands include hunting, trapping, fishing, hiking, snowshoeing, cross-county skiing, horseback riding, snowmobiling, and camping, although some properties prohibit some of these activities. Motorized vehicle use is prohibited except for on specified roads and trails.

Classifications

There are four categories of state forest lands established under New York State law; their descriptions are reproduced below.

Reforestation areas
Lands obtained for reforestation and maintained for watershed protection, the production of timber and other forest products, and for recreation and related purposes. These areas must have at least  of contiguous lands that shall be forever devoted to the planting, growth and harvesting of such trees as shall be reforested.

Multiple use areas
Funded by the park and recreation land acquisition bond acts of 1960 and 1962 to provide opportunities for outdoor recreation, including public camping, fishing, hunting, boating, winter sports. Wherever possible, the multiple-use-areas should also serve multiple purposes involving the conservation and development of natural resources, including the preservation of scenic areas, watershed protection, forestry and reforestation.

Unique areas
Lands of special natural beauty, wilderness character, geological, ecological or historical significance; the unique areas may include lands within a forest preserve county outside the Adirondack and Catskill Parks.

State Nature and Historic Preserve 
Lands dedicated to the State Nature and Historic Preserve (as referred to in Section 4 of Article XIV of the State Constitution) are declared to be put to their highest, best and most important use for one or more of the following purposes:

 As natural communities for maintaining plants, animals and natural communities;
 As reservoirs of natural materials and ecological processes that contribute to the state's biological diversity;
 As field laboratories for scientific research and education in the natural sciences, including the fields of biology, conservation, ecology, natural history and paleontology; and
 As places of natural and historical interest and beauty which provide the public with passive recreational opportunities including, where appropriate, fishing, hunting and trapping, or commercial fishing opportunities that are compatible with protecting the ecological significance, historic features and natural character of the area.

List of New York State Forests
The following sortable table includes several classifications of state forests in New York. Those labelled as "State Forests" are managed for a variety of goals; many are reforestation areas that are intended for timber production and watershed protection, in addition to providing space for outdoor recreation. "Multiple Use Areas" are managed primarily to provide space for outdoor recreation, with the additional purpose of land conservation and protection. "Unique Areas" are intended to protect areas with significant geological, ecological, aesthetic, or historical features.

See also
Long Island Central Pine Barrens
New York State Wildlife Management Areas

References

External links 
 

 
Forestry in the United States
Types of formally designated forests